Events from the year 2001 in Argentina

Incumbents
President: 
 until 20 December: Fernando de la Rúa 
 20 December-22 December: Ramón Puerta 
 22 December-30 December: Adolfo Rodríguez Saá 
 starting 30 December: Eduardo Camaño
Vice President: vacant

Governors
Governor of Buenos Aires Province: Carlos Ruckauf 
Governor of Catamarca Province: Oscar Castillo 
Governor of Chaco Province: Ángel Rozas 
Governor of Chubut Province: José Luis Lizurume 
Governor of Córdoba: José Manuel De la Sota 
Governor of Corrientes Province: 
 until 20 March: Ramón Mestre
 20 March-10 December: Oscar Aguad
 starting 10 December: Ricardo Colombi 
Governor of Entre Ríos Province: Sergio Montiel 
Governor of Formosa Province: Gildo Insfrán
Governor of Jujuy Province: Eduardo Fellner 
Governor of La Pampa Province: Rubén Marín 
Governor of La Rioja Province: Ángel Maza 
Governor of Mendoza Province: Roberto Iglesias 
Governor of Misiones Province: Carlos Rovira
Governor of Neuquén Province: Jorge Sobisch 
Governor of Río Negro Province: Pablo Verani 
Governor of Salta Province: Juan Carlos Romero 
Governor of San Juan Province: Alfredo Avelín 
Governor of San Luis Province: Adolfo Rodríguez Saá (until 23 December); María Alicia Lemme (starting 23 December)
Governor of Santa Cruz Province: Néstor Kirchner 
Governor of Santa Fe Province: Carlos Reutemann 
Governor of Santiago del Estero: Carlos Juárez (until 15 December); Carlos Ricardo Díaz (starting 15 December)
Governor of Tierra del Fuego: Carlos Manfredotti 
Governor of Tucumán: Julio Miranda

Vice Governors
Vice Governor of Buenos Aires Province: Felipe Solá 
Vice Governor of Catamarca Province: Hernán Colombo 
Vice Governor of Chaco Province: Roy Nikisch 
Vice Governor of Corrientes Province: vacant (until 10 December); Eduardo Leonel Galantini (starting 10 December)
Vice Governor of Entre Rios Province: Edelmiro Tomás Pauletti 
Vice Governor of Formosa Province: Floro Bogado 
Vice Governor of Jujuy Province: Rubén Daza 
Vice Governor of La Pampa Province: Heriberto Mediza 
Vice Governor of La Rioja Province: Luis Beder Herrera 
Vice Governor of Misiones Province: Mercedes Margarita Oviedo
Vice Governor of Nenquen Province: Jorge Sapag 
Vice Governor of Rio Negro Province: Bautista Mendioroz 
Vice Governor of Salta Province: Walter Wayar 
Vice Governor of San Juan Province: Marcelo Lima
Vice Governor of San Luis Province: María Alicia Lemme (until 10 December); vacant thereafter (starting 10 December)
Vice Governor of Santa Cruz: vacant
Vice Governor of Santa Fe Province: Marcelo Muniagurria 
Vice Governor of Santiago del Estero: vacant 
Vice Governor of Tierra del Fuego: Daniel Gallo

Events

 4 February: Murder of Natalia Melmann in Miramar.
 16 December: Unemployed activists and protestors demanding food from supermarkets cause several incidents in Greater Buenos Aires.
 18 December: Supermarkets and convenience stores start being looted in several places of Greater Buenos Aires and Rosario.
 19 December: President de la Rúa declares a state of emergency. Cacerolazos erupt in major cities. Minister Domingo Cavallo resigns.
 20 December: Argentine economic crisis: December riots: Riots erupt in Buenos Aires. Violent incidents in Plaza de Mayo between protestors and police, and in other parts of the country. 26 people die. The president resigns. President Fernando de la Rúa resigns two days later.
 22 December: After Congress deliberations, Adolfo Rodríguez Saá is appointed interim president.
 30 December: Rodríguez Saá fails to obtain political support from his fellow party members, and resigns after only a week in office.

Full date unknown
La cumparsita rock 72 band is formed in Villa Elvira, La Plata.

Births
 January 17: Enzo Fernández, footballer
 July 18: Agustina Roth, BMX rider

Deaths
 January 19: Dario Vittori, Italian-Argentinian actor and producer (b. 1921)
 March 4: Gerardo Barbero (b. 1961), chess grandmaster
 October 3: Gregorio Peralta (b. 1935), heavyweight boxer

Sports
See worldwide 2001 in sports

References

 
Argentina
Years of the 21st century in Argentina
2000s in Argentina
Argentina